Sylwia Zyzańska (born 27 July 1997) is a Polish archer. She won the silver medal in the women's individual event at the 2019 Military World Games held in Wuhan, China. She competed in the women's individual event at the 2020 Summer Olympics.

References

External links
 

1997 births
Living people
Polish female archers
Olympic archers of Poland
Archers at the 2020 Summer Olympics
Place of birth missing (living people)
Archers at the 2014 Summer Youth Olympics
European Games competitors for Poland
Archers at the 2019 European Games
20th-century Polish women
21st-century Polish women